Johnson Creek Airport  is a grass airstrip in Central Idaho  south of Yellow Pine, a village in Valley County, Idaho, United States. It is managed by the Idaho Division of Aeronautics of the Idaho Transportation Department. A caretaker resides at the field and the turf runway is well cared for. Johnson Creek is a backcountry airstrip and is popular with pilots who enjoy airplane camping.

Facilities 

For the 12-month period ending October 24, 2003, the airport had 5,750 aircraft operations, an average of 15 per day: 87% general aviation and 13% air taxi.

Also on the airport is a campground for fly-in campers, along with complimentary hot showers, a bunk house, pit toilets, and two courtesy rental cars. The airport has a small shelter with a freezer, a telephone, map of the area, bench, and a small sign-in book that logs all the arrivals and departures. The caretaker frequently mows and waters the grass of the runway and parking areas, provides freshly chopped firewood for campers, and maintains the campground and courtesy cars.

Accidents and Incidents
On August 15, 2022, an Aviat Husky aircraft crashed about 265 feet northeast of the departure end of runway 35. Both occupants (twin brothers) were fatally injured.

References

External links 
Johnson Creek Airport at Idaho Transportation Department
Time-lapse animation of the webcam located at Johnson Creek Airport (Website currently unavailable)

Airports in Idaho
Buildings and structures in Valley County, Idaho
Transportation in Valley County, Idaho